The 1933–34 season was Galatasaray SK's 30th in existence and the club's 22nd consecutive season in the Istanbul Football League.

In this season, 25 of Galatasaray's members, including some founders, left the club to build a new one called Güneş SK in 1933. It was their reaction to Fethi İsfendiyaroğlu' decision to exclude Eşref Şefik Atabey from the club. İsfendiyaroğlu was Galatasaray's president, and also the principal of the Galatasaray High School. Atabey had written negative things about Galatasaray in the sports magazine Olympiad.

Squad statistics

Squad changes for the 1933–1934 season

In:

Competitions

Istanbul Football League

Standings

Matches
Kick-off listed in local time (EEST)

 After the match on 23 February 1934, Istanbul Football Committee punished 8 players from Galatasaray SK.
 Tevfik Baha - banned from League for 6 months
 Avni Kurgan - banned from League for 2 months
 Nihat Bekdik - banned from League for 2 months
 Kadri Dağ - banned from League for 2 months
 Lütfü Aksoy - banned from League for 2 months
 İbrahim Tusder - banned from League for 2 months
 Necdet Cici - banned from League for 2 months
 Fazıl Özkaptan - banned from League for 2 months

İstanbul Shield

Friendly Matches

Şeref Turnuvası

References
 Atabeyoğlu, Cem. 1453-1991 Türk Spor Tarihi Ansiklopedisi. page(127).(1991) An Grafik Basın Sanayi ve Ticaret AŞ
 Tekil, Süleyman. Dünden bugüne Galatasaray, (1983), page(64-65, 140, 179-180). Arset Matbaacılık Kol.Şti.
 Futbol vol.2. Galatasaray. Page: 587. Tercüman Spor Ansiklopedisi. (1981)Tercüman Gazetecilik ve Matbaacılık AŞ.

External links
 Galatasaray Sports Club Official Website 
 Turkish Football Federation - Galatasaray A.Ş. 
 uefa.com - Galatasaray AŞ

Galatasaray S.K. (football) seasons
Turkish football clubs 1933–34 season
1930s in Istanbul